Most of the officially designated symbols of the U.S. state of California are found in sections 420-429.8 of the California Government Code.

State symbols

Motto: Eureka, Adopted: 1963
Nicknames: Golden State (official), Adopted: 1968
Song: I Love You, California, Adopted: 1988

See also
List of California-related topics
Lists of United States state insignia
State of California

References

External links
California State Symbols

State symbols
California